Flight rules are regulations and procedures adopted for flying aircraft in various conditions. Flight rule regimes include:

 Instrument flight rules, regulations and procedures for flying aircraft by referring only to the aircraft instrument panel for navigation
 Night visual flight rules, the rules under which flight primarily by visual reference is done at night
 Special visual flight rules, a set of aviation regulations under which a pilot may operate an aircraft
 Visual flight rules, a set of regulations which allow a pilot to operate an aircraft in weather conditions generally clear enough to allow the pilot to see where the aircraft is going

See also
 Instrument meteorological conditions, weather conditions that normally require pilots to fly under instrument flight rules
 Visual meteorological conditions, weather conditions that normally require pilots to fly under visual flight rules

Aviation safety
Aviation law